The Câlniștea Mică is a left tributary of the river Câlniștea in Romania. It flows into the Câlniștea near Botoroaga.

References

Rivers of Romania
Rivers of Teleorman County